Yeo Hong-Chul (Hangul: 여홍철, Hanja: 呂洪哲, Revised Romanization: Yeo Hong-cheol; born 28 May 1971 in Gwangju) is a retired South Korean gymnast. He participated in three Olympics, winning a silver medal, and retired after the 2000 Summer Olympics.

Career
Yeo won the silver medal in the vault event at the 1996 Summer Olympics. He also participated in 1992 Summer Olympics, 1994 Asian Games, 1998 Asian Games and 2000 Summer Olympics. After the 2000 Summer Olympics, he announced his retirement. He has two vault skills named after him. His daughter would later conceive her own eponymous FIG-recognized vault skill by combining the "Yeo I" and "Yeo II".

He competed on the Japanese obstacle course show, Sasuke, four different times (7th, 8th, 11th, 12th tournaments), but failed to clear the first stage every time.

After retiring, Yeo earned his doctorate degree at Korea National Sport University. He is a professor at Kyung Hee University's College of Physical Education. His research has largely been focused on the kinetic motions of elite athletes.

He served as a commentator for KBS's domestic broadcasts of artistic gymnastics events at the 2020 Summer Olympics.

Personal life
Yeo is married to former artistic gymnast Kim Chae-eun (formerly Kim Yoon-ji), who also competed at the 1994 Asian Games and won a bronze medal in the team event. They have two daughters and remain involved in sports; besides lecturing, Yeo has been a guest commentator for gymnastics competitions while Kim is in an administrative role in the Korean Gymnastics Association. Their younger daughter, Yeo Seo-jeong, is also an Olympic medalist on vault, having won a bronze medal in the 2020 Olympic vault final.

Filmography

Television shows

References

External links
 
 
 
 Yeo (Vault)

Living people
1971 births
South Korean male artistic gymnasts
Olympic gymnasts of South Korea
Gymnasts at the 1992 Summer Olympics
Gymnasts at the 1996 Summer Olympics
Gymnasts at the 2000 Summer Olympics
Olympic silver medalists for South Korea
Medalists at the World Artistic Gymnastics Championships
Olympic medalists in gymnastics
Sasuke (TV series) contestants
Asian Games medalists in gymnastics
Gymnasts at the 1994 Asian Games
Gymnasts at the 1998 Asian Games
Medalists at the 1996 Summer Olympics
Asian Games gold medalists for South Korea
Asian Games silver medalists for South Korea
Medalists at the 1994 Asian Games
Medalists at the 1998 Asian Games
Universiade medalists in gymnastics
Universiade gold medalists for South Korea
Universiade silver medalists for South Korea
Hamyang Yeo clan
Originators of elements in artistic gymnastics
Korea National Sport University alumni
Kyung Hee University alumni
Academic staff of Kyung Hee University
South Korean sports commentators